The Lion is a historic steam locomotive at the Maine State Museum in Augusta, Maine, USA.  Built in 1846 for use on a logging railroad, it is the oldest known American-built locomotive in New England.  It was listed on the National Register of Historic Places in 1976.

Description
The Lion is set on display, prominently located near the entrance to the Maine State Museum. Mounted on this frame is a five-section boiler, with a dry steam dome near its center, from which steam is piped to the steam chest, which drives the pistons that move the train. The boiler and cylinders were insulated with a thin layer of wood, which was covered by a thin layer of iron. The main stack is located at the front, and has an unusual inverted cone shape, apparently intended to deflect sparks and cinders that came from the exhaust.

It has been stated that the Lion cost originally $2,700, exclusive of the tender. The bore and stroke of its cylinders are 9½ inches and 17 inches, respectively, and the diameter of the four wheels is approximately 42½ inches. The gauge is standard, 56½ inches. The locomotive alone weighs 9 tons.

History
The locomotive was built by Hinkley & Drury (Hinkley Locomotive Works) in 1846 as the Lion for the Machiasport Railroad of eastern Maine. The Lion operated as a working locomotive until 1890. It was sold in 1897 to Thoman Towle of Portland, Maine. It was then purchased by the City of Portland and appeared in the 1898 Fourth of July parade. The Lion was given to the University of Maine at Machias in 1905 and was displayed and owned by the University until 1985 when it was given to the Maine State Museum. It was added to the National Register of Historic Places in 1976. The Lion is the oldest American-built locomotive in New England.

See also
National Register of Historic Places listings in Kennebec County, Maine

References

Railway locomotives on the National Register of Historic Places
1846 works
Early steam locomotives
National Register of Historic Places in Augusta, Maine
Tourist attractions in Augusta, Maine
Rail transportation on the National Register of Historic Places in Maine
Preserved steam locomotives of Maine